Ballbank is an area in the south western part of the Riverina and situated about  north from Murrabit and  north west from Barham.

Ballbank used to be a part of the Stony Crossing railway line and lies between Murrabit and Nacurrie.

Notes and references

Towns in the Riverina
Towns in New South Wales
Murray River Council